Martin Hloušek (born 2 October 1979 in Kosice) is a Slovak football player who currently plays for the Slovak 3. liga club FC Lokomotíva Košice.

Career

Club
In January 2011, he joined Wisła Płock.

References

External links
 
 
 Guardian Football

1979 births
Living people
Slovak footballers
FC VSS Košice players
MFK Ružomberok players
MŠK Rimavská Sobota players
MŠK Púchov players
Czech First League players
1. FK Příbram players
MŠK Novohrad Lučenec players
FC Lokomotíva Košice players
Slovak Super Liga players
Sandecja Nowy Sącz players
Wisła Płock players
Slovak expatriate sportspeople in the Czech Republic
Slovak expatriate sportspeople in Russia
Slovak expatriate footballers
Expatriate footballers in Poland
Sportspeople from Košice

Association football midfielders
Slovak expatriate sportspeople in Poland